The Swan 42 was designed by Ron Holland and built by Nautor's Swan and first launched in 1980.

External links
 Nautor Swan
 Designer Official Website

References

Sailing yachts
Keelboats
1980s sailboat type designs
Sailboat types built by Nautor Swan
Sailboat type designs by Ron Holland